Lord King may refer to:

 Baron King, a title created in 1725 and later held by the Earl of Lovelace
 John King, Baron King of Wartnaby (1917–2005), a former chairman of British Airways and Conservative life peer.
 Mervyn King, Baron King of Lothbury (born 1948), former Governor of the Bank of England and chairman of its Monetary Policy Committee 2003–2013, now a Crossbench life peer.
 Tarsem King, Baron King of West Bromwich (1937–2013), a Labour local councillor 1979–2007, ennobled as Britain's first Sikh peer.
 Tom King, Baron King of Bridgwater (born 1933), a British Conservative politician and Secretary of State for Defence.